The Fixer Upper Mysteries is a series which airs on Hallmark Movies & Mysteries channel.

The films star Jewel and Colin Ferguson and are filmed in the US and Canada. They are based on the Fixer Upper Mystery novels by Kate Carlisle and the first aired in 2017.

Series overview
The series centers around a construction company owner and expert in home renovation (Jewel) and her involvement in criminal investigations with a local investigative reporter (Ferguson).

Cast and characters
 Shannon Hughes (Jewel) owns a construction company and is a home renovation expert.
 Mac Sullivan (Colin Ferguson) is an investigative reporter.
 Jennifer Hennessey (Erin Karpluk) is Hughes' best friend.
 Pete Hughes (Ron Lea) is Hughes' father.

List of films

References 

Entertainment Studios films
2010s English-language films
American mystery drama films
Hallmark Channel original programming
Hallmark Channel original films
American drama television films